Ringwood Secondary College  is a co-educational public secondary school located in the eastern suburb of Ringwood in Melbourne, Victoria, Australia.

Ringwood Secondary College opened as Ringwood High School in 1954 and was one of the first high schools to be constructed in the new Light Timber Construction (LTC) style, which was developed by the Public Works Department in Victoria to address a chronic shortage in high school places in the 1950s.

Ringwood Secondary College provides education for years 7-12. Year 11 and 12 students undertake the VCE program. There are currently approximately 1460 students enrolled at the school.

RSC offers an extensive range of Victorian Certificate of Education (VCE) subjects as well as the Victorian Certificate of Applied Learning (VCAL) programme. The college has developed a centre of excellence for Automotive, Engineering and Manufacturing.

The celebrated Music and Performing Arts Program at Ringwood Secondary College includes three concert bands, four stage bands, three string ensembles and two choirs. In recent competitions, Melbourne School Bands Festival, Mt Gambier Generations in Jazz and the Royal South Street Competition, the school has received awards for its stage bands, strings ensembles and symphonic orchestra.

The RSC Musical Production is a major highlight of the College Calendar each year. The full-scale theatrical event brings together students from all of the performing arts areas of the college. The professional shows draw crowds of over 3000 each year, with some students having gone on to successful careers both on stage and in the technical areas of theatre production.

Notable alumni
Mark Bolton: Australian Football League player for Essendon Football Club
Professor Warwick Gullett, Dean of Law at the University of Wollongong, author, and academic in environmental and maritime law
Benjamin Grant Mitchell: singer/songwriter and actor in Neighbours
Geoff Paine: plays Clive Gibbons in Neighbours
Jess Sinclair: Australian Football League player for North Melbourne Football Club
 John Wood actor in Blue Heelers, Offspring and Neighbours
 Keith Wolahan: Federal Politician for Menzies since 2022

Modern culture
The Ringwood Secondary College Choir and Orchestra appeared in a 1998 Music Video by Australian alternative band This Is Serious Mum, leading fans to believe that one or more of the anonymous band members were actually teachers at the college.

References

External links
 
 http://intranet.ringwoodsc.vic.edu.au/laptopprogram/
 https://web.archive.org/web/20060821065814/http://www.mec.vic.edu.au/
 http://www.rttf.vic.edu.au/
 http://wiki.ringwoodsc.vic.edu.au/

Educational institutions established in 1955
Secondary schools in Melbourne
Rock Eisteddfod Challenge participants
1955 establishments in Australia
Ringwood, Victoria
Buildings and structures in the City of Maroondah